Giovanni Filoramo (born 18 May 1945) is an Italian scholar of gnosticism. A professor of History of Christianity at the University of Turin and he has published a number of books.

Bibliography
(Partial)
 L’attesa della fine. Storia della gnosi (1983), English transl. A history of Gnosticism (1990)
 Il risveglio della gnosi ovvero diventare dio (1990)
 Cristianesimo e societa antica (co-author, 1992)
 Religione e modernita: il caso del fondamentalismo (2000)
 Manuale di storia delle religioni (co-author, 2003)
 Veggenti, profeti, gnostici. Identita e conflitti nel cristianesimo antico (2005)
 Cristianesimo (2007)
 La Chiesa e le sfide della modernita (2007)

References

Living people
1945 births
Italian historians of religion
Date of birth missing (living people)
Place of birth missing (living people)
Historians of Gnosticism